The Committee on Rules, or more commonly, the Rules Committee, is a committee of the United States House of Representatives. It is responsible for the rules under which bills will be presented to the House of Representatives, unlike other committees, which often deal with a specific area of policy. The committee is often considered one of the most powerful committees as it influences the introduction and process of legislation through the House. Thus it has garnered the nickname the "traffic cop of Congress". A rule is a simple resolution of the House of Representatives, usually reported by the Committee on Rules, to permit the immediate consideration of a legislative measure, notwithstanding the usual order of business, and to prescribe conditions for its debate and amendment.

Jurisdiction
When a bill is reported out of one of the other committees, it does not go straight to the House floor, because the House, unlike the United States Senate, does not have unlimited debate and discussion on a bill. Instead, what may be said and done to a bill is strictly limited. This limitation is performed by the Rules Committee.

When a bill is reported out of another committee with legislative jurisdiction, it is placed on the appropriate House Calendar for debate. Common practice, though, is for bills reported from committees to be considered in the Rules Committee, which will decide for how long and under what rules the full body will debate the proposition.

Consideration by the full body can occur in one of two forums: the Committee of the Whole, or on the floor of the full House of Representatives itself. Different traditions govern whether the Committee of the Whole or the House itself will debate a given resolution, and the Rules Committee generally sets the forum under which a proposition will be debated and the amendment/time limitations for every measure, too. For instance, there might be a limit on the number or types of amendments (proposed changes to the bill). Amendments might only be allowed to specific sections of the bill, or no amendments might be allowed at all. Besides control over amendments, the rule issued by the Rules Committee also determines the amount of speaking time assigned on each bill or resolution. If the leadership wants a bill pushed forward quietly, for instance, there might be no debate time scheduled; if they want attention, they might allow time for lengthy speeches in support of the bill.

Between control over amendments, debate, and when measures will be considered, the Rules Committee exerts vast power in the House. As such, the majority party will usually be very keen on controlling it tightly. While most House committees maintain membership in a rough proportion to the full chamber (if the majority party controls 55% of the House, it will tend to have 55% of committee seats), membership on the Rules Committee is disproportionately in favor of the majority party. Furthermore, the rules committee typically operates in a very partisan fashion, advancing rules to the floor on straight party line votes in nearly all cases.

History
The Rules Committee was formed on April 2, 1789, during the first Congress. However, it had nowhere near the powerful role it has today. Instead, it merely proposed general rules for the House to follow when debating bills (rather than passing a special rule for each bill), and was dissolved after proposing these general rules. These general rules still have a great impact on the tone of the House floor today.

The Rules Committee, for a long time, lay dormant. For the first fifty years of its existence, it accomplished little beyond simply reaffirming these rules, and its role was very noncontroversial.

In 1880, the modern Rules Committee began to emerge from the reorganization of the House Committees. When the Republican Party took over the House in the election of 1880, they quickly realized the power that the Rules Committee possessed. One member, Thomas Brackett Reed (R-Maine), used a seat on the Rules Committee to vault himself to the Speakership, and gained so much power that he was referred to as "Czar Reed".

In the 1890s and 1900s, Reed and his successor, Joseph Gurney Cannon (R-Illinois) used the Rules Committee to centralize the power of the Speakership. Although their power to place members in committees and perform other functions was limited by a forced rule change in 1910, the Rules Committee retained its power. However, it ceased to function as the personal project of the Speaker, as it had originally; instead, as the seniority system took root, it was captured by a coalition of conservative Democrats and Republicans. This state of affairs would continue until the 1960s.

In 1961, Speaker Sam Rayburn (D-Texas), acting on the wishes of the new President John F. Kennedy and the Democratic Study Group, introduced a bill to enlarge the committee from 12 members to 15, to decrease the power of the arch-conservative chairman, Howard W. Smith (D-Virginia). The bill passed, 217 votes to 212. However, it was only partially successful; the Rules Committee continued to block legislation including civil rights and education bills.

In the 1970s, however, the Rules Committee was firmly under the command of the Speaker once again. As before, its primary role is to come up with special rules, to help or obstruct the chances of legislation reported to it.

General types of rules

The Rules Committee issues the following types of rules:
Open rule: Allows any member to offer any amendment in compliance with house rules under the five minute rule (a member argues for the amendment for 5 minutes, an opponent then argues against the amendment for 5 minutes, other members may then "strike the last word" to speak further on the Amendment, and the house then votes on the amendment). Debate continues until no one offers an amendment. NOTE: This type of Rule has not been used since June 10, 2014.
Modified open rule: Much like an open rule, but may require amendments to be preprinted in the congressional record beforehand, and may impose a total time limit for the consideration of all amendments, or for debate on each amendment.
Structured rule - Members submit amendments to the rules committee, and the rules committee selects which amendments may be considered on the floor.
Closed rule - Eliminates the opportunity to amend the bill on the floor, except under unanimous consent.

Most rules offer time for "general debate" before any amendment consideration begins (it is also possible for the rules committee to issue a rule for "general debate" only and later issue a second rule for amendment consideration) and allow for one motion to send the bill back to its committee of origination, with or without instructions for how to modify the bill. Rules may also include necessary authority for district work periods, and may waive or modify certain points of order or rules of the house if desired by the committee, and the committee is also allowed to self-execute amendments right in the rule rather than delegating this ability to the full house floor.

Members, 118th Congress

Resolutions electing members:  (Chair),  (Ranking Member),  (R),  (D)

Subcommittees
The Rules Committee operates with two subcommittees, one focusing on legislative and budget matters and one focusing on the internal operations of the House.

Source: Full membership, changes following the passing of former Rep. Hastings

Chairs, 1849–1853 and 1880–present
The Committee on Rules was created as a select committee but became a standing committee for the 31st and 32nd Congresses (1849–1853). In 1853, the panel reverted to being a select committee and remained one until 1880.

From 1880 to the revolt against Speaker Joseph Gurney Cannon in March 1910, the Speaker of the House also served as Chairman of the Rules Committee.

Beginning in 1999 with the chairmanship of Republican David Dreier of California, the chairman of the Rules Committee became a member of the elected Republican leadership, appointed by the Speaker of the House of Representatives.

Howard W. Smith of Virginia is the longest-serving chairman (1955–1967) since the committee's founding. David Dreier of California is the youngest chairman of the Rules Committee, assuming the position at the age of 46. He is also the longest-serving chairman (1999-2007, 2011–2013) since 1967. Louise Slaughter of New York is the first woman to chair the committee (2007-2011).

Historical members and subcommittees

Members, 114th Congress

Members, 115th Congress

Sources:  (R),  (D),  (D)

Members, 116th Congress

Sources:  (Chair),  (Ranking Member),  (D),  (R),  (D),  (D),  (D)

Members, 117th Congress

Sources:  (D),  (R),  (R),  (D), 

Subcommittees

See also

 List of current United States House of Representatives committees
 United States Senate Committee on Rules and Administration

References

Further reading
 Brauer, Carl M. "Women Activists, Southern Conservatives, and the Prohibition of Sex Discrimination in Title VII of the 1964 Civil Rights Act", 49 Journal of Southern History, February 1983 online via JSTOR
 Dierenfield, Bruce J. Keeper of the Rules: Congressman Howard W. Smith of Virginia (1987)
 Dion, Douglas, and John D. Huber. "Procedural choice and the house committee on rules." Journal of Politics (1996) 58#1 pp: 25–53. online
 Jenkins, Jeffery A., and Nathan W. Monroe. "Buying negative agenda control in the us house." American Journal of Political Science (2012) 56#4 pp: 897–912.
 Jones, Charles O. "Joseph G. Cannon and Howard W. Smith: an Essay on the Limits of Leadership in the House of Representatives" Journal of Politics 1968 30(3): 617–646.
 Moffett, Kenneth W. "Parties and Procedural Choice in the House Rules Committee." Congress & the Presidency (2012) 39#1 
 Race, A. "House Rules and Procedure." in New Directions in Congressional Politics (2012): 111+
 Robinson, James Arthur. The House rules committee(1963)
 Schickler, Eric; Pearson, Kathryn. "Agenda Control, Majority Party Power, and the House Committee on Rules, 1937-52," Legislative Studies Quarterly (2009) 34#4 pp 455–491
 Smallwood, James. "Sam Rayburn and the Rules Committee Change of 1961." East Texas Historical Journal 11.1 (1973): 10+ online.

 Woods, Clinton Jacob, "Strange Bedfellows: Congressman Howard W. Smith and the Inclusion of Sex Discrimination in the 1964 Civil Rights Act," Southern Studies, 16 (Spring–Summer 2009), 1–32.

External links

Official website of the committee (Archive)
House Rules Committee. Legislation activity and reports, Congress.gov.
House Rules Committee Hearings and Meetings Video. Congress.gov.

Rules
1789 establishments in the United States
Organizations established in 1789